The Chairperson of the Barbuda Council is the leader of the Barbudan Government, in the eastern Caribbean.  Established by the Barbuda Local Government Act of 1976, its first election was on March 22, 1979.

Role in the Council Meetings 
The Chairman can remove any person from the public from visiting Council meetings, that are always open to the public. The Vice Chairman will take the role of Chairperson in the event of the Chairperson being absent from a session.

List of chairpeople
Below is a table of Chairs of the Barbuda Council

References 

Barbuda Council
Heads of local government